North Crows Nest is a town in Washington Township, Marion County, Indiana. The town is adjacent to the neighboring community of Crows Nest. The population was 45 at the 2010 census. It has existed as an "included town" since 1970, when it was incorporated into Indianapolis as part of Unigov. It is part of Indianapolis, but retains town governmental powers under IC 36-3-1-11.

Geography
North Crows Nest is located at  (39.867307, -86.163751).

Demographics

2010 census
As of the census of 2010, there were 45 people, 19 households, and 15 families living in the town. The racial makeup of the town was 100.0% White.

There were 19 households, of which 21.1% had children under the age of 18 living with them, 73.7% were married couples living together, 5.3% had a male householder with no wife present, and 21.1% were non-families. 15.8% of all households were made up of individuals, and 5.3% had someone living alone who was 65 years of age or older. The average household size was 2.37 and the average family size was 2.67.

The median age in the town was 47.5 years. 22.2% of residents were under the age of 18; 0.0% were between the ages of 18 and 24; 22.2% were from 25 to 44; 31% were from 45 to 64; and 24.4% were 65 years of age or older. The gender makeup of the town was 51.1% male and 48.9% female.

2000 census
As of the census of 2000, there were 42 people, 18 households, and 16 families living in the town. The racial makeup of the town was 100.00% White.

There were 18 households, out of which 22.2% had children under the age of 18 living with them, 72.2% were married couples living together, 5.6% had a female householder with no husband present, and 11.1% were non-families. 11.1% of all households were made up of individuals, and none had someone living alone who was 65 years of age or older. The average household size was 2.33 and the average family size was 2.50.

In the town, the population was spread out, with 9.5% under the age of 18, 9.5% from 18 to 24, 14.3% from 25 to 44, 42.9% from 45 to 64, and 23.8% who were 65 years of age or older. The median age was 55 years. For every 100 females, there were 100.0 males. For every 100 females age 18 and over, there were 111.1 males.

The median income for a household in the town was $132,364, and the median income for a family was $132,364. Males had a median income of $100,000 versus $12,083 for females. The per capita income for the town was $48,029. None of the population or the families were below the poverty line.

References 

Towns in Marion County, Indiana
Towns in Indiana
Indianapolis metropolitan area